Woezer See is a lake in the Ludwigslust-Parchim district in Mecklenburg-Vorpommern, Germany. At an elevation of 35.1 m, its surface area is 0.57 km².

External links 
 

Lakes of Mecklenburg-Western Pomerania